Kino Springs is a census-designated place (CDP) in Santa Cruz County, Arizona, United States. The population was 136 at the 2010 census.

Geography
Kino Springs lies on the western foothills of the Patagonia Mountains with the highest peak, Mount Washington, rising approximately four miles due east. The Mexican border lies about 1.5 miles to the south.

Demographics

See also

 List of census-designated places in Arizona

References

External links

Census-designated places in Santa Cruz County, Arizona
Populated places in the Sonoran Desert